The 1979 Ballon d'Or,  given to the best football player in Europe as judged by a panel of sports journalists from UEFA member countries, was awarded to the English forward Kevin Keegan on 25 December 1979. There were 26 voters, from Austria, Belgium, Bulgaria, Czechoslovakia, Denmark, East Germany, England, Finland, France, Greece, Hungary, Italy, Luxembourg, the Netherlands, Poland, Portugal, Republic of Ireland, Romania, Scotland, Soviet Union, Spain, Sweden, Switzerland, Turkey, West Germany and Yugoslavia.

Rankings

References

External links
 France Football Official Ballon d'Or page

1979
1979–80 in European football